Ettore Blasi (born 18 March 1895, date of death unknown) was an Italian long-distance runner, mainly specialized in marathon.

Biography
Blasi participated at two editions of the Summer Olympics (1920, 1924), these are the only two caps in national team.

Olympic participation

National titles
Blasi won five individual national championship.
4 wins in the half marathon (1919, 1920, 1921, 1922)
1 win in the marathon (1923)

See also
Italy at the 1920 Summer Olympics
Italy at the 1924 Summer Olympics

References

External links
 
  Describes rivalry between Blasi and Primo Brega, with list of results of races in which both appeared

1895 births
Year of death missing
Athletes (track and field) at the 1920 Summer Olympics
Athletes (track and field) at the 1924 Summer Olympics
Italian male long-distance runners
Italian male marathon runners
Olympic athletes of Italy
Athletes from Rome